More Milk, Yvette (1966) is an avant garde film directed by Andy Warhol and filmed at The Factory. The film is Andy Warhol's tribute to Lana Turner and Johnny Stompanato, and features Warhol superstar Mario Montez in the role of Turner, and also features Paul Caruso and Richard Schmidt.

The film is 67 minutes long, has never been commercially released on DVD or VHS, and is one of Warhol's least seen pieces from The Factory period.

See also
 Andy Warhol filmography

References

External links 
 
 Article: "PROTHALMION FOR WET HARMONICA AND JOHNNY STOMPANATO" - First-person account of the filming of More Milk Yvette at Warhol's The Factory, by Donald Newlove (8 pages, The Realist No. 68, pgs 1 and 17-23, August 1966)
 1966 review of the film by the New York Times (free registration)
More Milk, Yvette at WarholStars

Films directed by Andy Warhol
1966 films
American black-and-white films
1960s English-language films
1960s American films